Moogerah is a rural locality in the Scenic Rim Region, Queensland, Australia.

Geography 

The Moogerah Dam and its reservoir, Lake Moogerah are located in the north of the locality. The lake is fed by Reynolds Creek.

Moogerah has the following mountains:

 Mount Alford (Teenaryvilla) 
 Mount Asplenium 
 Mount Greville (Meebalboogan) 
 Mount Neilson 
 Panorama Point 
 The Bluff

History 
The name Moogerah was used by Yuggera people, meaning thunder.

The estate was centred around the confluence of Coulsen's and Reynold's Creek, land which is now under the Moogerah Dam. One of the advertised benefits of the estate was its proximity to the proposed Via Recta railway (a "straight" route from Brisbane to Sydney), which was never built.

Moogerah Provisional School opened on 4 August 1908. It became Moogerah State School on 1 January 1909. The school closed in 1962. It was at 1601 Lake Moogerah Road.

Moogerah Dam State School opened on 24 August 1959 and closed on 28 August 1961.

The locality contains 133 households, in which 47.8% of the population are males and 52.2% of the population are females with a median age of 50, 12 years above the national average. The average weekly household income is $945, $493 below the national average. 2.6% of Moogerah's population is either of Aborigional or Torres Strait Islander descent. 73.9% of the population aged 15 or over is either registered or de facto married, while 26.1% of the population is not married. 28.4% of the population is currently attending some form of a compulsory education. The most common nominated ancestries were Australian (28.8%), English (27.9%) and Irish (10.3%), while the most common country of birth was Australia (82.5%), and the most commonly spoken language at home was English (82.7%). The most common nominated religions were No religion (24.4%), Catholic (19.2%) and Not stated (16.2%). The most common occupation was a manager (28.9%) and the majority/plurality of residents worked 40 or more hours per week (52.4%).

Amenities 

There are a number of boat ramps into Moogerah Dam, all managed by the Scenic Rim Regional Council:

 Muller Park (Northern) boat ramp off Muller Park Road

 Muller Park (South) boat ramp off Muller Park road
 Moogerah Dam (Western) boat ramp off Ski Zone Road

References

Further reading 

 

Scenic Rim Region
Localities in Queensland